The following highways are numbered 378:

Canada
Saskatchewan Highway 378

Japan
 Japan National Route 378

United States
  Interstate 378 (former)
  U.S. Route 378
  Georgia State Route 378
  Louisiana Highway 378
  Maryland Route 378 (unsigned)
  Nevada State Route 378 (former)
  New Mexico State Road 378
  New York State Route 378
  Ohio State Route 378
  Pennsylvania Route 378
  Puerto Rico Highway 378
  Virginia State Route 378